Nimbia may refer to:

Nimbia occlusa, a form of Ediacaran fossil
The Nimbia dialect of the Gwandara language